Norma Elizabeth Sotelo Ochoa (born 25 October 1963) is a Mexican politician affiliated with the Institutional Revolutionary Party. She served as federal deputy of the LIX Legislature of the Mexican Congress as a plurinominal representative, as well as a local deputy in the LXI Legislature of the Congress of Durango. She also served as municipal president of Cuencamé from 1995 to 1998.

References

1963 births
Living people
Politicians from Durango
Women members of the Chamber of Deputies (Mexico)
Members of the Chamber of Deputies (Mexico)
Institutional Revolutionary Party politicians
Universidad Juárez del Estado de Durango alumni
Members of the Congress of Durango
Municipal presidents in Durango
20th-century Mexican politicians
20th-century Mexican women politicians
21st-century Mexican politicians
21st-century Mexican women politicians
Deputies of the LIX Legislature of Mexico